Do You may refer to:

 Do You (album), an album by Sheena Easton
 "Do You..." (Miguel song), a song by Miguel
 "Do You (Bro'Sis song), a song by Bro'Sis
 "Do You" (Ne-Yo song), a song by Ne-Yo
 "Do You", a song by Jay Sean from All or Nothing
 "Do You", a song by Spoon from They Want My Soul
 "Do You?", a song by Rebecca Black
 "Do You?", a song by Naaz
 Do You!: 12 Laws to Access the Power in You to Achieve Happiness and Success, (2007) a book by Russell Simmons and Chris Morrow

See also 
 Do Ya (disambiguation)